The Holy Terror is a 1929 Our Gang short silent comedy film directed by Anthony Mack. It was the 83rd Our Gang short in the series and is considered to have been lost in the 1965 MGM vault fire.

Cast

The Gang
 Mary Ann Jackson as Mary Ann
 Joe Cobb as Joe Cobb
 Jean Darling as Jean
 Allen Hoskins as Farina
 Bobby Hutchins as Wheezer
 Harry Spear as Harry
 Pete the Pup as himself

See also
 Our Gang filmography

References

External links

1929 films
American silent short films
American black-and-white films
Films directed by Robert A. McGowan
Lost American films
Hal Roach Studios short films
1929 comedy films
Our Gang films
1920s American films
Silent American comedy films